Penton railway station served the parish of Penton from 1862 to 1969 on the Border Union Railway.

History 
The station opened on 1 March 1862 by the Border Union Railway. It was situated on the west side of an unnamed minor road at the end of a short approach road. There was no footbridge; passengers had to use a barrow crossing at the north end of the platforms to get to the other platform. In the early days there was a coal siding to the south, whilst there was a private siding for Kingfield House to the north. The goods yard had two long sidings and a loop siding which served a cattle dock. The goods yard closed on 9 October 1967. The station closed to passengers and goods traffic on 6 January 1969.

References

External links 

Disused railway stations in Cumbria
Railway stations in Great Britain opened in 1862
Railway stations in Great Britain closed in 1969
Beeching closures in England
Former North British Railway stations
1862 establishments in England
1969 disestablishments in Scotland